Tony McGuinness may refer to:

Tony McGuinness (footballer) (born 1964), Australian footballer
Tony McGuinness (English musician) (born 1959), English musician
Tony McGuinness (Irish musician), Irish musician